White Company may refer to:

 White Company – A 14th-century English mercenary company which operated in Italy, originally known as the Great Company of English and Germans.
 The White Company (1891) – A historical adventure novel by Arthur Conan Doyle.
 The White Company (retailer) – A chain of English houseware and furniture stores.
 White Furniture Company – American furniture manufacturing company which operated from 1881 to 1993.
 White Motor Company – An American automobile, truck, bus and agricultural tractor manufacturer which operated from 1900 until 1980.
White Farm Equipment – A subsidiary which still operates under AGCO.
 White Sewing Machine Company – American company founded in 1858 which was eventually absorbed by Electrolux in 1986

See also
White and Company was an Illinois manufacturer of stoneware and tile which is connected to two archaeological sites:
White and Company's Goose Lake Stoneware Manufactury
White and Company's Goose Lake Tile Works